The Niue rail (Gallirallus huiatua) is an extinct species of flightless bird in the Rallidae, or rail family.

History
The rail was described in 2000 from subfossil bones collected in January 1995 by paleozoologist Trevor Worthy at the Anakuli cave site in Hakupu village, on the island of Niue in West Polynesia.  The age range of about 5300 to 3600 year BP for fossil material collected from the site predates human settlement of the island.

Etymology
The specific epithet comes from the Niuean words hui (bones) and atua (of the dead).

See also
 List of birds of Niue

References

Gallirallus
Extinct flightless birds
Birds of Niue
Late Quaternary prehistoric birds
Holocene extinctions
Fossil taxa described in 2000
Extinct birds of Oceania
Birds described in 2000